Warren Dean (born 9 March 1964) is a former Australian rules footballer who played for Melbourne in the Victorian Football League (VFL) during the late 1980s.

A forward from Subiaco, Dean played 19 games with Melbourne in 1987. He featured prominently in the Elimination Final win over North Melbourne with three goals and four behinds. Dean also appeared in Melbourne's losing Preliminary Final team which missed out on the premiership decider when Jim Stynes gave away a free kick in the dying seconds. At times inaccurate in front of goals, he kicked six behinds for no goals in a game against Sydney the following season. He was a Western Australian State of Origin representative and played in the 1988 Adelaide Bicentennial Carnival.

Dean was traded to West Coast in the 1990 Preseason Draft but could not break into their seniors.

References

Bibliography
Holmesby, Russell and Main, Jim (2007). The Encyclopedia of AFL Footballers. 7th ed. Melbourne: Bas Publishing.

External Links

1964 births
Living people
Melbourne Football Club players
Subiaco Football Club players
Western Australian State of Origin players
Australian rules footballers from Western Australia